Cravath, Swaine & Moore LLP (known as Cravath) is an American white-shoe law firm with its headquarters in New York City, and additional offices in London and Washington, D.C. The firm is known for its complex and high profile litigation and mergers & acquisitions work.

History
In 1854, former college classmates William H. Seward (later Abraham Lincoln's Secretary of State) and Richard M. Blatchford merged their respective law firms, forming Blatchford, Seward & Griswold.

Blatchford served in the New York State Assembly, and as U.S. Minister to the State of the Church. His son, Samuel, also a partner at the firm, served as a federal district court and appeals court judge, was appointed to the United States Supreme Court, in 1882, by President Chester Arthur, serving for 11 years until his death; he was the first person to serve at all three levels of the judiciary. Seward served as both Governor and Senator from New York, supported the 1865 passing of the Thirteenth Amendment, and negotiated the 1867 purchase of Alaska from Russia in a transaction that his opponents derisively called "Seward's Folly" and "Seward's Icebox", though since noted as a "bargain Basement deal" that was the principal positive accomplishment of the Andrew Johnson presidency.

Paul Drennan Cravath joined the firm in 1899, and devised the "Cravath System", combining a distinct method of hiring, training, and compensating lawyers. His name was added to the firm name in 1901 and, in 1944, after a series of name changes, the Cravath, Swaine & Moore name was established and has not been altered since.

Cravath has represented noted American inventors Samuel F.B. Morse, in the late 1840s; Cyrus McCormick, Elias Howe, and Charles Goodyear in the 1850s; and George Westinghouse in the 1880s. Some current client relationships that began in the 1800s are with CBS, JPMorgan, and PricewaterhouseCoopers. The firm has had a long record of clients in the US railroad industry beginning with the New York & Erie and Union Pacific railroads, and express delivery businesses such as Adams, Southern, and Wells Fargo. Its 19th century history includes the 1808 insanity defense of William Freeman for the murder of John G. Van Nest, the 1848 Jones v. Van Zandt challenge to the constitutionality of slavery, and the Pollock v. Farmers' Loan and Trust Company tax case of 1895. Cases of mention before the Supreme, appellate and Chancery courts in more recent decades have been Kiobel v. Royal Dutch Petroleum Co., Westfed Holdings Inc. v. United States, and City of Providence v. First Citizens BancShares Inc. et al. Important litigation work with IBM has included two landmark antitrust cases, one of which was a 13-year battle dubbed by Time magazine as “the case of the century."

The firm has represented entities in the United Kingdom and Europe since the 1820s from the Bank of England, to landmark public offerings by EU predecessors since the 1950s. HM Treasury, Grupo Modelo, Santander, and HDFC Bank are among more recent international clients. Cravath drew attention to its bankruptcy practice on November 10, 2010, by offering free representation in advance of a likely Chapter 9 filing for Harrisburg, Pennsylvania. The firm's restructuring work traces back to clients such as Goodyear in 1921. After their 1916 reorganization of corporations lectures before the Bar of the City of New York, Paul D. Cravath and William D. Guthrie were reviewed to be "men of wide experience in these matters," and several of their partners including Alexander I. Henderson and Robert T. Swaine "ranked among the leaders of the reorganization bar."

In November 2014, Cravath handled three M&A transactions in one day, spanning advertising, spirits, and pharmaceutical industries; and acted as legal advisor in a recently announced deal backed by 3G Capital and Berkshire Hathaway Inc. that will create the third-largest food and beverage company in North America. Other significant representations have included legal work necessary to form NBC, United Airlines in its merger with Continental Airlines, the world's largest airline, to Unilever in its acquisition of Alberto-Culver. In 2010, its litigation department won summary judgment for Morgan Stanley on its breach of contract claim against Discover Financial Services. In a subsequent settlement, Discover agreed to pay Morgan Stanley $775 million to resolve the litigation. In the same year they successfully represented Barnes & Noble in a landmark "poison pill" trial. In the past several decades Cravath has represented Netscape in its antitrust suit against Microsoft, resulting in a $750 million settlement; major merger and acquisition deals, such as the DuPont-Conoco merger, the Ford-Jaguar merger, the Bristol-Myers-Squibb merger, the Time-Warner merger, and the AOL-Time-Warner merger; and two famed libel suits: defending Time Inc. against Israeli General Ariel Sharon, and also defending CBS against U.S. Army General William Westmoreland.

Unlike others, Cravath has remained a relatively small firm. Its approximately 500 lawyers are located primarily in the New York Office, with a few dozen in the London office, which opened in 1973. The firm opened a Hong Kong office in 1994, closing it nine years later.

In 2015, Cravath, Swaine and Moore was the victim of what the firm described as a "limited breach" of its computer network, which The New York Times connected to a 2016 court case against three Chinese hackers who had made more than $4 million from insider information about merger deals.

In March 2019, the New-York Historical Society Museum & Library debuted an installation highlighting the firm, which illustrates legal milestones across two centuries, including obtaining patents for both the telegraph and the sewing machine, organizing NBC, and securing equal access to locker rooms for women sports reporters, exhibited "through a collection of unique documents, photographs, and prints."

Notable clients and cases 
In 1848, the firm (then Seward & Blatchford) brought the Jones v. Van Zandt challenge to the constitutionality of slavery.

In the early 1940s, the firm represented Esquire in Esquire v. Walker, later Hannegan v. Esquire, Inc., at the U.S. Supreme Court, successfully fighting off the attempted censorship of its magazine by the two postmasters General in 1946.

In the 1960s, Cravath lawyers wrote the U.S. Supreme Court brief on behalf of the Congress of Racial Equality’s Freedom rides protesting segregated buses, and were called upon by President John F. Kennedy to help form the Lawyers’ Committee for Civil Rights Under Law.

In 1966, the firm helped launch litigation that would become Miranda v. Arizona, which established that states cannot interrogate suspects without informing them of the right to counsel, now implemented as the Miranda warning issued by police to criminal suspects taken into custody.

In 1971, as The Washington Post prepared to publish the Pentagon Papers, Cravath reformed the publisher as a public company that was structured to protect editorial freedom.

In 1989, the firm argued before the U.S. Supreme Court on behalf of African American and women firefighters in Birmingham, Alabama. The case was a catalyst for the Civil Rights Act of 1991. Cravath concluded successful plaintiff representation in United States v. Jefferson County in December 2020.

During 2019 - 2021, Cravath represented Epic Games in litigation against Apple Inc., Epic Games v. Apple, alleging anticompetitive behavior in the distribution of mobile apps and the processing of in-app purchases.

Rankings and awards
Based on a survey of law firm associate attorneys rating the reputations of firms other than their own, Cravath ranked as the #1 law firm in the United States in the annual "Vault Law 100", in 2017, 2018 and 2019, and either #1 or #2 annually, since 2007. and the 2017 Above The Law Power 100 and Office 100. In 2016 Chambers and Partners ranked Cravath in the top tier among U.S. law firms for Banking & Finance, Capital Markets (Debt & Equity), Corporate/M&A (The Elite), Environment (Mainly Transactional), Media & Entertainment (Corporate), Securities Litigation, General Commercial Litigation (The Elite) and Tax.

Cravath was ranked 52 in The American Lawyer's Am Law 200 in 2022, which lists the firm by revenue and profits per lawyer, compensation and other criteria. The annual gross revenue was $1.001b. Revenue per lawyer was $2.035m and profits per partner were $5.803m. In 2015, Cravath had been ranked eight by profits per partner.

Hiring

Under the Cravath System, the firm is known for focusing its hiring on associates straight from law school, with a strong emphasis on grades, then over years of apprenticeship rotations, immersing them in details of every aspect of corporate law practice. Under this philosophy, lateral hires are rare, with some exceptions. In 2005, Cravath hired Andrew W. Needham, formerly a tax partner at Willkie Farr & Gallagher, as the first lateral partner since Herbert L. Camp, also a tax partner, from the now-defunct Donovan Leisure Newton & Irvine in 1987. Camp, however, had previously been a Cravath associate and is therefore not considered a true lateral because he started his career there. Before that, Roswell Magill, a former Treasury Department official, became a Cravath tax partner in 1943. In 2007, the firm brought in Richard Levin from Skadden, Arps to boost its new bankruptcy practice. In 2011, Cravath hired Christine A. Varney, a former U.S. Assistant Attorney General for the Antitrust Division for the Obama Administration. This was criticized as a revolving door case, as Cravath later had Varney represent AT&T in its acquisition of Time Warner, which the Antitrust Division let pass. In 2013, the firm hired David Kappos, who served as the Under Secretary of Commerce for Intellectual Property and Director of the United States Patent and Trademark Office.

In addition, the system includes lockstep compensation on a published scale, which has tended to be consistent with the scale paid by most leading US law firms, and is known (for historical reasons) as the "Cravath Scale".

See also
List of largest law firms by profits per partner
List of Cravath, Swaine & Moore employees

References

Further reading
Oller, John (2019) White Shoe: How a New Breed of Wall Street Lawyers Changed Big Business--and the American Century

External links
Cravath, Swaine & Moore LLP website
Chambers and Partners profile

 
Law firms established in 1819
Law firms based in New York City
Economy of London
1819 establishments in the United States